George Bottomley (born 5 March 1846, date of death unknown) was a New Zealand cricketer. He played two first-class matches for Otago in 1889/90.

Born at Skelton in Yorkshire, Bottomley worked in New Zealand as a gatekeeper.

References

External links
 

1846 births
Year of death missing
New Zealand cricketers
Otago cricketers
Sportspeople from Yorkshire